David Wayne Menefee is an American writer and editor from Fort Worth, Texas. After working as a journalist for the Dallas Times Herald, he has written and published several works about stars of the silent film era. In addition, he has served as an editor on numerous other books.

His Richard Barthelmess: A Life in Pictures (2009) was named by the San Francisco Examiner as one of the Top Ten Film Books of 2009.

Biography
He was born in Fort Worth, Texas, a member of a long-established family among the earliest American settlers in Texas. The Menefee family is honored with an historical marker administered by the Texas Historical Commission. His great-great-grandfather, William Menefee, was one of the signers of the Texas Declaration of Independence from Mexico. William’s portrait hangs in the San Jacinto Monument in San Jacinto, Texas.

Menefee started his writing career in 1979 as a writer and marketing representative for the Dallas Times Herald, working for twelve years during an era characterized by fierce competition with an archrival, the Dallas Morning News. In 1991, the Dallas Morning News bought out the Herald, closed the business, and within weeks, razed the building to the ground. Associates from the Dallas Morning News invited Menefee to join their operation, which combined their circulation with subscribers obtained by their acquisition of the Herald. Menefee took on leadership responsibilities with their locally produced version of Parade Magazine, for which he anonymously contributed many articles.

Freelance writer and editor
Menefee, like many of his contemporaries, broke away from the newspaper industry in 2003 when failing economics forced many publications to downsize or close altogether. He struck out on his own as a freelance writer, immediately finding success with several books about the silent film era: Sarah Bernhardt in the Theater of Films and Sound Recordings (McFarland, 2003), The First Female Stars: Women of the Silent Era (Greenwood Praeger, 2004), and The First Male Stars: Men of the Silent Era (BearManor Media, 2008).

In 2006, Menefee worked for Brown Books Publishing Group, serving as editor on Sonnets by Robert Brown, Slaves to Medicine by Dr. George Beauchamp, and Downtown Dallas: Romantic Past, Modern Renaissance by Mark Rice. That year, he collaborated with Richard Davis on Lilian Hall-Davis: The English Rose, a biography of Britain’s noted silent film star.

In 2007, Menefee embarked on an effort to research stars from the Golden Age of Hollywood. He visited and communicated with major archives around the world in a detailed exploration of archive contents to unearth the  materials available for several biographies. In 2008, after amassing enough materials for several books, Menefee began working on multiple projects. He completed some for publication within the following two years.

In 2009, Menefee worked for BearManor Media, serving as editor on Best in Hollywood: The Good, The Bad, and the Beautiful by James Best and Jim Clark, Burlesque: A Living History by Jane Briggeman, Johnny Olson: A Voice in Time by Randy West. Also in 2009, Menefee was the author of Richard Barthelmess: A Life in Pictures.

In 2010, Menefee shared credit along with William Thomas, Jr. on "Otay" The Billy "Buckwheat" Thomas Story. He also edited Tales from the Script by author Gene Perrett, Six Cult Films from the Sixties by author Ib Melchior, Will the Real Me Please Stand Up by author Christopher Knopf, Endless Summer: My Life With The Beach Boys by author Jack Lloyd, Confessions of a Scream Queen by author Matt Beckoff, as well as Now and Then, The Movies Get It Right by Neal Stannard.

Early in 2010, Menefee published George O'Brien: A Man's Man in Hollywood, the first full-length biography and filmography of one of Hollywood's most beloved stars. Menefee earned many positive reviews, including one from John Gallagher in the April 2010 National Board of Review: 
"Menefee has done his research here, accessing the O’Brien estate, and loading the book with great graphics and rare photos. O’Brien was the son of the Chief of Police of San Francisco, and the author does a particularly excellent job in recreating the details of the 1906 earthquake and fire, which the O’Brien family survived."

Cynthia Tobar from the Mina Rees Library at CUNY Graduate Center wrote, 
"One can't help but envision George O'Brien as anything less than a hero in life as well as on screen when reading David W. Menefee's richly detailed biography. This touching tribute pays homage to an actor popular with directors and audiences alike . . . researchers will marvel at Menefee's ability to seamlessly interweave absorbing narratives of the lives of those who crossed paths with O'Brien or helped him along his way to stardom . . . this book will prove a rich resource for film historians interested in the silent era and the development of the Western genre."

In 2011, BearManor Media published Menefee's Wally: The True Wallace Reid Story (Foreword by Robert Osborne), the first full-length tribute to the renowned silent film star, Wallace Reid. He also served as editor for actress Marilyn Knowlden's autobiography Little Girl in Big Pictures.

Also in 2011, with the creation of Menefee Publishing, Inc., Menefee published Sarah Bernhardt, Her Films, Her Recordings, Charlie O'Doone's Second Chance and Other Stories. In addition, with co-author Robert L. Willis, he launched a new mystery series featuring detective Margot Cranston, including the first four titles, The Secret of the St. Lawrence Lighthouse, The Mystery at Loon Lake, and The Quest for the Jade Dragons. He also published the historical fiction novels, Brothers of the Storm about African American history, and The Remarkable Mr. Messing, about surviving the Holocaust in World War Two. Other works published include The Rise and Fall of Lou-Tellegen, the first biography of actor Lou-Tellegen; and Falling Stars: 10 Who Tried to be a Movie Star.

In 2012, his works included Sweet Memories, about the Mary Pickford / Owen Moore romance, and Can't Help Falling in Love  (with co-author Carol Dunitz.)

Menefee is working on a film project, Triple Crown, a screenplay about the famous jockey Earl Sande, written in collaboration with Richard J. Maturi.

“I believe in doing thorough research”, Menefee said in a recent interview. “For thirty years, I researched the life and work of Sarah Bernhardt in order to produce the first ever in-depth account of her work in motion pictures and on sound recordings, a part of the Divine Sarah’s work that most of her biographers tended to skip over. There is an old saying that a writer should only write about what he or she knows, and I’m certain that is always the right course to take.”

Works as author
 The First Male Stars: Men of the Silent Era
 The First Female Stars: Women of the Silent Era 
 Sarah Bernhardt in the Theater of Films and Sound Recordings
 Richard Barthelmess: A Life in Pictures 
 George O'Brien: A Man's Man in Hollywood 
 with William Thomas, Jr., Otay! The Billy Buckwheat Thomas Story

References

Sources
 Review of Sarah Bernhardt in the Theater of Films and Sound Recordings by Catherine Ritchie, Theater Librarian, Fine Arts Division Dallas (TX) Public Library, in Broadside, 2003.
 Choice, September 2004.
 Booklist, June 2004.
 Journal of American Studies, 2005.
 Thomas Gladysz, "Top Ten Film Books of 2009," San Francisco Examiner, 15 December 2009
 Western Clippings Issue #93, January/February 2010, p. 14.
 "George O'Brien: A Man's Man in Hollywood." By John Gallagher in Between Action and Cut. New York: National Board of Review, April 2010.
 Review of George O'Brien A Man's Man in Hollywood by Cynthia Tobar, Mina Rees Library, CUNY Graduate Center, in Broadside, Summer 2010.

External links
 http://www.mcfarlandpub.com/
 http://www.greenwood.com/
 https://web.archive.org/web/20080730025444/http://bearmanormedia.bizland.com/

Year of birth missing (living people)
Living people
American male non-fiction writers
American non-fiction writers
American newspaper journalists
Writers from Texas